Magnificat is a large-scale sacred composition, a musical setting of the biblical canticle Magnificat, for bass soloist, men's and boys' voices, two mixed choirs, and orchestra, by Krzysztof Penderecki, completed in 1974. It was commissioned for the 1200th anniversary of the Salzburg Cathedral, where it was premiered on 17 August 1974, conducted by the composer.

History 
Penderecki was commissioned to compose the piece by the Austrian broadcaster ORF for the 1200th anniversary of the Salzburg Cathedral. He wrote the music from 1973 to 1974.

The composer conducted the first performance on 17 August 1974 at the Salzburg Cathedral, with Peter Lagger, the ORF Symphony Orchestra and Choir, the Wiener Sängerknaben and the Schola Cantorum Stuttgart. It was published by Schott.

Structure and scoring 
Penderecki scored the Magnificat for a bass soloist, a vocal ensemble of seven men's voices, two mixed choirs of at least 24 voices each, boys' voices and orchestra. He structured the work in seven movements:

The duration is given as 40 minutes. The first section begins with a sustained note which grows to a cluster, into which the choir enters the initial text. The second section is a fugue in dense texture, with sub-divided voices and rich harmonies. In the third section, mercy (misericordia) is depicted by high woodwinds and strings with the voices in chordal clusters. The solo bass expresses power (potentia) in the fourth section, first juxtaposed by lower strings, then concluding alone but still with high intensity. The fifth section is a passacaglia which includes declaimed text sung, spoken and whispered, reminiscent of Penderecki's earlier choral compositions. The sixth section is the most complex, with the voices and several instruments in exchanges, and solo voices corresponding to instrumental motifs. After a climax that "pivots between tonal stability and disintegration", with brass dominating but interjected by strings and timpani, the conclusion arrives in a "mood of anxious and equivocal calm".

Awards 
Penderecki received the 1977 Prix Arthur Honegger for the work.

Recording 
The composition was recorded by Warsaw Philharmonic Orchestra, conducted by Antoni Wit, with Wojtek Gierlach as the soloist. In her review in The Guardian, Kate Molleson noted that the composer wrote his early sacred music in defiance of the Communist regime in Poland and observed that Penderecki was in a period of transition from avant-garde composition to reminiscences of late-romantic music and his Magnificat mixes tone clusters and diatonic chords. On the recording, Magnificat is juxtaposed with Penderecki's Kadisz ["Kaddish"], composed in 2009.

References

Further reading

External links 
 Presseaussendung der Salzburger Festspiele / Nachruf zum Tod von / Krzysztof Penderecki (in German) Salzburg Festival 29 March 2020

Compositions by Krzysztof Penderecki
Contemporary classical compositions
Choral compositions
Magnificat settings
1974 compositions